Anna in Kungfuland is a 2003 Hong Kong romantic comedy martial arts film directed by Raymond Yip, and starring Miriam Yeung and Ekin Cheng.

Plot
Anna (Miriam Yeung) is an aspiring actress, and her father was a monk of the Shaolin temple who defected to Japan after representing the temple during a martial arts tournament. There he met a Japanese woman and later bore Anna. He starts a martial school in Japan, although he dreams of being reconciled with his former mates.

Anna enters a martial arts tournament, which she hopes will lead to her getting her acting career started. She falls in love with the marketing executive (Ekin Cheng) who organized the tournament.

Cast
 Miriam Yeung as Anna Shek
 Ekin Cheng as Ken Kei
 Wong You-nam as Sam Kei
 Denise Ho as Zoe Pak
 Cheung Tat-ming as Tournament MC
 Maggie Lau as Big twin
 Mandy Chiang as Small twin
 Benz Hui as Boss Pak
 Lee Lik-chi as Hung Fung
 Lau Kar-wing as Master Wisdom
 Chiu Suet-fei as Nicky
 Charles Ingram as Spencer
 Yasuaki Kurata as Sword Shek
 Tats Lau as Fu
 Lo Mang as Ox
 Michael Clements as Hollywood producer

References

External links
 
 
 

2003 films
2003 romantic comedy films
2003 martial arts films
Hong Kong romantic comedy films
2000s Cantonese-language films
Hong Kong martial arts comedy films
Martial arts tournament films
Films directed by Raymond Yip
Films shot in Japan
Films set in Japan
Japan in non-Japanese culture
2000s Hong Kong films